Paracincia is a genus of moths in the subfamily Arctiinae. The genus was erected by William Dewitt Field in 1950.

Species
 Paracincia butleri Field, 1950
 Paracincia dognini Field, 1950

References

Lithosiini